The François Truffaut Award was an Italian film award, named in memory of French director François Truffaut, that was awarded from 1988 to 2014 at the Giffoni Film Festival.

Recipients
 1988: Ida Di Benedetto, Paolo and Vittorio Taviani, and Louis Malle
 1989: Barbara De Rossi, Lina Sastri, Ben Gazzara, Margarethe von Trotta, Claudio Amendola, and Marco Risi
 1990: Mauro Bolognini, Liliana Cavani, Liv Ullmann, Jean-Jacques Annaud, Nanni Loy, Bud Spencer, Francesco Nuti, Jeremy Irons, Giuliano Gemma, and Francesco Cossiga
 1991: Gian Maria Volonté, Michelangelo Antonioni
 1992: Rita Levi Montalcini
 1993: Abbas Kiarostami, Mikado Film
 1994: Alberto Sordi
 1995: Ben Kingsley, Jon Voight, Gabriele Salvatores, and Krzysztof Kieslowski
 1996: Mickey Rooney, Geraldine Chaplin, Carlo Lizzani, Franco Amurri, Lino Banfi, Chiara Caselli, Cristina Comencini, Antonio Capuano, Pasquale Pozzessere, Eleonora Giorgi, Giulio Scarpati, Bud Spencer, and Kim Rossi Stuart
 2001: Ray Liotta
 2006: Kathy Bates
 2008: Meg Ryan, Tim Roth
 2009: Laura Morante, Baz Luhrmann
 2010: Susan Sarandon
 2011: Hilary Swank, Edward Norton, and Jovanotti
 2012: Jean Reno
 2013: Giancarlo Giannini
 2014: Alan Rickman

References

External links
 Giffoni Film Festival at the Internet Movie Database

French film awards
Awards established in 1988
1988 establishments in France